SKP Engineering College (SKPEC) is an engineering college in Chinnakangiyanur, Tiruvannamalai, Tamil Nadu, India, founded in 1999 with the aim of providing a technical education to rural citizens in and around Tiruvannamalai and provide them with the skills needed to pursue successful professional careers.

S.K.P Engineering College is a self-financing college, sponsored by Sri. S. Kuppusaamy Memorial Educational Trust. The college is approved by the AICTE, New Delhi and currently affiliated to the Anna University, Chennai. The college, initially approved to start with four B.E. / B.Tech. programmes with the student intake of 240, now is offering seven B.E. / B.Tech. programmes in UG and seven PG programmes in Engineering and one PG programme in Management with annual approved intake of 810 students.

Programs
SKP Engineering College offers a variety of courses aimed at educating students about engineering. Courses of study include:

B.E. Electronics And Communication Engineering
B.E. Computer Science And Engineering
B.Tech Information Technology
B.E. Electrical And Electronics Engineering
B.E. Mechanical Engineering
B.E. Civil Engineering
B.E Aeronautical Engineering
M.E. Applied Electronics
M.E. Computer Science
M.E. VLSI Design
M.E. Embedded System Design
M.E. Power System Engineering
M.E. Engineering Design
M.B.A-Master Of Business Administration

References

External links
 Official Website

Engineering colleges in Tamil Nadu
Colleges affiliated to Anna University
Education in Tiruvannamalai district
Educational institutions established in 1999
1999 establishments in Tamil Nadu